Priscilla Jean Fortescue Buchan, Baroness Tweedsmuir of Belhelvie  (née Thomson; 25 January 1915 – 11 March 1978), styled as Priscilla, Lady Grant between 1934 and 1944, and as Lady Tweedsmuir between 1948 and 1970, was a Unionist and Conservative politician.

Early life
The daughter of Brigadier Alan F. Thomson DSO, she married Major Sir Arthur Lindsay Grant, 11th Baronet, Grenadier Guards, in 1934. He was killed in action in 1944. She subsequently married author and politician the 2nd Baron Tweedsmuir in 1948.

House of Commons
Lady Tweedsmuir was an unsuccessful parliamentary candidate for Aberdeen North in July 1945, and was elected for Aberdeen South in 1946, holding the seat until 1966. She consistently polled at least 50% of the vote with the exception of her defeat in 1966, a feat never achieved by any succeeding candidates in the constituency.

She was a delegate to the Council of Europe from 1950 to 1953, a UK Delegate to the General Assembly of the United Nations, 1960–1961; Joint Parliamentary Under-Secretary of State for Scotland from 1962 to 1964.

House of Lords
On 1 July 1970 she was created a life peer as Baroness Tweedsmuir of Belhelvie, of Potterton in the County of Aberdeen.

Tweedsmuir was Minister of State at the Scottish Office from 1970 to 1972 and at the Foreign and Commonwealth Office from 1972 to 1974 and was sworn of the Privy Council in 1974. In the House of Lords she served as Principal Deputy Chairman of Committees, 1974–1977, and as Chairman of the Select Committee on European Communities, 1974–1977. She was also a Deputy Speaker.

She died of cancer in 1978, aged 63.

Legacy
She was mentioned several times in the 2014 Loyal Address to Parliament on 4 June in the House of Commons by Penny Mordaunt.

In 1983, the veteran Labour politician Emanuel Shinwell stated Tweedsmuir was 'the best' female MP Britain had had.

References

External links
 

1915 births
1978 deaths
Deaths from cancer in Scotland
Members of the Parliament of the United Kingdom for Aberdeen constituencies
Scottish Conservative Party MPs
Life peeresses created by Elizabeth II
Conservative Party (UK) life peers
Members of the Privy Council of the United Kingdom
Female members of the Parliament of the United Kingdom for Scottish constituencies
Unionist Party (Scotland) MPs
UK MPs 1945–1950
UK MPs 1950–1951
UK MPs 1951–1955
UK MPs 1955–1959
UK MPs 1959–1964
UK MPs 1964–1966
UK MPs who were granted peerages
20th-century Scottish women politicians
20th-century Scottish politicians
Wives of baronets
British baronesses
Ministers in the Macmillan and Douglas-Home governments, 1957–1964